The George M. Barker Company Warehouse is an historic building located at 1525 7th Street, Northwest, Washington, D.C., in the Logan Circle-Shaw neighborhood.

History
It was designed by A.M. Poynton and constructed in 1906 as a lumber, coal and wood distribution warehouse.

It is now used by Bread for the City, a local social service organization, and above the door is written "Dignity, Respect, Service."

References

Industrial buildings and structures on the National Register of Historic Places in Washington, D.C.
Industrial buildings completed in 1906
Warehouses on the National Register of Historic Places
1906 establishments in Washington, D.C.